Willis Clarence Crenshaw (born July 16, 1941) is a former National Football League running back from 1964 through 1970.

High school and college career
Born in St. Louis, Missouri, Crenshaw played for Soldan High School and Kansas State University, where he started out at wide receiver and was a star player; played in the 1963 College All Star Football Game.

Professional career

St Louis Cardinals
Crenshaw was drafted by the St. Louis Cardinals in the 9th round in 1963. In 1968 he led the team in rushing with 813 yds and touchdowns (7).

Denver Broncos
In 1970 he was traded to the Denver Broncos in exchange for a 3rd-round draft pick; he played one season, although he was listed for the 1971 season.

Later career
Crenshaw later worked selling life insurance, for Monsanto, and as a financial planner.

References

External links
 Willis Crenshaw at John Troan's Pro Players database, updated April 21, 2018.

Living people
1941 births
Players of American football from St. Louis
American football running backs
Kansas State Wildcats football players
St. Louis Cardinals (football) players
Denver Broncos players